The Steyr M is a series of semi-automatic pistols developed by Steyr Mannlicher GmbH & Co KG of Austria for police services and the civilian shooting market. Design work on the new pistol began in the early 1990s and the final product known as the M9 (adapted to fire the 9×19mm Parabellum cartridge) was officially unveiled in the spring of 1999. The M40 version chambered in .40 S&W was developed before the M9, followed later by the M357 (chambered in .357 SIG) and two smaller variants of the M9 and M40 designated the S9 and S40 respectively. These pistols were developed primarily for concealed carry and have a shortened barrel, slide, smaller frame and a reduced magazine capacity. In 2013, the Steyr M (Medium) and S (Small) form factors were complemented by the L (Large) sized series and the C (Compact) sized  series both available in 9×19mm Parabellum and .40 S&W chamberings as the L9-A1, L40-A1, C9-A1 and C40-A1.

Design details

Design on the Steyr M began in 1999 by Friedrich Aigner and Wilhelm Bubits. Steyr wanted to take advantage of recent advancements in manufacturing techniques. The slide is precision-milled from steel; and coated in a tenifer finish. The frame is an injection-molded synthetic polymer and parts of the trigger and striker mechanisms are pressed from sheet metal. The Steyr M series uses a very high grip profile which holds the barrel axis close to the shooter's hand and makes the Steyr M more comfortable to shoot by reducing muzzle rise and allowing for faster aim recovery in rapid shooting sequence. Hammerless and striker-fired, the Steyr M features a double action only (DAO) pre-set trigger mechanism marketed as a "Reset Action" trigger. When the trigger is in the forward position, the firing pin spring remains lightly compressed (pre-cocked by the forward motion of the slide as it returns to battery). Pulling the trigger all the way to the back will compress the firing pin spring completely, draw the firing pin fully to the rear and position the trigger bar to release the firing pin and fire a round.

The Steyr M series of pistols employs the mechanically locked Browning short recoil method of operation with a linkless, vertically dropping barrel. The cold-hammer-forged conventional rifled barrel is locked to the slide by means of a single rectangular lug around the barrel chamber that recesses into the ejection port in the slide. When fired, the recoil impulse from the ignited cartridge drives the barrel and slide back, locked together until the bullet leaves the barrel and pressures drop to a safe level. A locking block integrated into the frame then engages a lug at the base of the chamber and drives the barrel downward, separating it from the slide and terminating any further rearward movement while the slide continues back in a straight line. The pistols are fed using a detachable steel magazine of the single position feed type with the cartridges arranged in a staggered column pattern. The magazine's follower and floor plate are fabricated from polymer. The magazine catch-release is located on the left side of the frame, directly behind the trigger guard. After expending the last cartridge from the magazine, the pistol's slide remains locked open on the metal slide stop, located on the left side of the frame and operated with the thumb.

The pistol has a multi-stage safety system consisting of two automatic internal safeties, two external trigger safeties and a manual lock safety. The first external trigger safety acts as the primary fail-safe. A small, spring-loaded inner trigger is housed in a wide, outer trigger and cannot be actuated unless the inset trigger is depressed first. This keeps the trigger from being pulled by an inadvertent off-angle trigger pull. This trigger safety also activates and when released—deactivates the two internal safeties: the firing pin and drop safety. The firing pin safety is contained in the pistol's slide and blocks the longitudinal movement of the striker. The second trigger safety is an optional, manually operated plastic bar located inside the trigger guard and projecting out from the base of the pistol's frame when activated, revealing a small white dot. This indicates that the pistol is currently incapable of being fired. It is used as an additional safety that disables the trigger with the firing pin spring cocked (after reloading the pistol). This safety is engaged by simultaneously pushing in two buttons on both sides of the frame and then deactivated by simply lifting the trigger finger and pushing the bar up and into the pistol's frame, thus allowing the trigger to be pulled back and the weapon fired.

These safeties enable safe handling of the pistol with a round present in the chamber (the so-called "cocked and locked" condition) and allow for rapid deployment and immediate firing; this arrangement however does not permit the firing mechanism to be re-cocked in case of a misfire after the trigger has been pulled. Other safety features include a loaded chamber indicator and an integrated limited access lock operated using a key to prevent unauthorized use. The latter key can be either a handcuff key or a special factory-supplied key. If required, the access lock can be omitted. The locking mechanism is located above the trigger area of the pistol and is characterized by a small circular plate with two holes in it (in the police version of the pistols there is a handcuff key hole instead of the two small holes). It has two positions: "F" and "S". When pushed in and rotated to the "S" position with the provided key, the lock disables the trigger and barrel and prevents the pistol from being disassembled. This unique system of limiting access to the weapon was patented by Friedrich Aigner in 1999.

The Steyr M series derives its name from the unique "trapezoidal" sight picture of its fixed, low-profile iron sights. The unique sighting arrangement consists of a triangular front sight and a trapezoid rear notch that lead the eye to the target for quicker target acquisition and allow for instinctive aiming. The front sight contains a non-luminescent white triangle contrast element designed to mate with two white rectangles on the rear sight. Optional adjustable or non-adjustable tritium-illuminated three-dot low light situation sights can also be fitted to the Steyr M; these have a conventional rectangular profile. The original pistol's frame also has proprietary mounting rails for attaching accessories, such as a tactical light or laser pointer.

While the Steyr M is frequently compared to Glock-series pistols (both are polymer-framed striker-fired pistols, with Tenifer finishes), there are several differences in the details of the design. For example, the M-series had a fully supported chamber in all chamberings from the start (Some Glock models also had this feature from the start, other Glock models evolved to having more supported chambers when compared to their original internal layout), unique triangular/trapezoid sights, three loaded chamber indicators (both visual and tactile as the extractor will protrude slightly when the chamber is loaded, there is also a witness hole on the top of the barrel and a rod on the back of the slide that protrudes when the chamber is loaded) and a different grip angle (111°). Takedown is also considerably different as on the Steyr M, a button must be depressed while a takedown lever is rotated down. Glock pistols require you to pull two levers downward while pulling slightly back on the slide in order to take the pistol apart. Both designs, however, require the user to pull the trigger to complete a field strip.

Product evolution

First-generation models
The original M models were produced from 1999 to 2004 and are considered "first generation" designs. These models have a relatively smooth frame with the Steyr Arms logo imprinted on both sides of the grip, no thumb rests, no accessory rail and a rounded trigger guard. The first generation guns only are available in the M size, in 9mm, .40 S&W and .357 SIG. The first generation guns were only produced in the M (Medium) and S (Sub-Compact/Small) sizes.

Second-generation models
In 2004, an improved version of the pistol replaced the original Steyr M in production. The new 'second generation' Steyr M-A1 and S-A1 pistols received several improvements. These incorporated more textured surfaces on the grip and magazine well, which were both redesigned to improve ergonomics. Other features include enhanced finger grooves, stippling on the front and back straps, a straightened trigger guard, thumb rests and a single-slot 2324 Picatinny accessory rail. On second generation guns, the manual safety button was now optional (not in models sold in the United States, all US imports lack the manual safety). Later 'second generation' models also have a modified extractor for easier ejecting of casings. Second generation models also incorporated Steyr's target insignia with "Mannlicher" molded into the left side of the grip to signify the company. In 2009, Steyr stopped importing the second generation line, citing economic fluctuation that meant they were unable to price the guns competitively.

Third-generation models
In 2010, Steyr Mannlicher US began reimporting Steyr M-A1 and S-A1 pistols with a newly updated design. Third generation guns can be confusing because they are marked A1 just like the second generation guns and share the same grip design, but they can be identified by the Steyr Arms target insignia on both sides of the grip. Third generation models also have a roll pin in the slide just under the rear sight element, a reversible magazine release button for left-handed shooters, an improved trigger and magazines with a plus-two round baseplate. These new 15+2 (in 9mm) and 12+2 (in .40) magazines are fully compatible and interchangeable with both newer guns and older guns in the series. Steyr offers conversion kits to swap 'third generation' models between 9×19mm Parabellum and .40 S&W. These kits consist of a slide, barrel, recoil spring assembly and magazine. .357 SIG production ceased in 2014.

The third generation also saw the introduction of two new models. The first was introduced in 2010 and designated the C-A1 (for "Compact"), which combined the longer M-sized grip and the shorter S-sized slide and barrel. The Cs were offered in 9×19mm Parabellum and .40 S&W chamberings as the C9-A1 and C40-A1. For Italy only, the C9-A1 is offered in the 9×21mm chambering. In 2013, the L-A1 size was introduced which incorporated a longer slide and barrel than the M size. The L-A1 series features front cocking serrations on the slides and its  barrel length puts it more in line with full-size service pistols offered by other manufacturers. At the time, the third generation models were produced for the longest period of time and are typically the most commonly seen in the series.

Fourth-generation models
In 2019 Steyr introduced the A2 MF series in 9×19mm Parabellum in three form factors: the Large size L9-A2 MF, Medium M9-A2 MF and Compact C9-A2 MF. The "S" models were not continued in the fourth generation. The "MF" in the designations stands for Modular Frame. The 'fourth generation' A2 MF series have a (serialized) removable chassis/trigger pack, making them not backwards compatible to previous series. The revised grip frame features a full-length STANAG 2324 Picatinny rail, more aggressive surface texturing, a lengthened beaver tail and is adjustable to user preferences with different sized back-straps and side grip inlay panels. The conspicuous finger support protrusion on the upper half of the grip is omitted and the grip has a flared magazine well. The magazines were modified and feature orange followers. The ejector was modified to counteract erratic spent cartridge case ejection. Dimensionally the A2 MF series are somewhat longer and wider than the preceding A1 series and can be ordered with an olive drab grip frame.

Distribution
The M class of handguns is imported by Steyr Arms. Steyr Arms is a wholly owned subsidiary of Steyr Mannlicher GmbH & Co KG and is its exclusive importer and distributor in the United States. Steyr Arms is located at 2530 Morgan Road in Bessemer, Alabama. Contact information is (205) 417-8644; www.steyrarms.com

Users

Current users
: Polícia Judiciária de Cabo Verde
: SEK
: Used by Police SWAT
: Royal Malaysian Police 
: Pakistan Air Force
: Royal Thai Air Force, Special Operation Regiment, JAS-39 Pilot Pistol, F-16 Pilot Pistol
: Police Special Operation Department

Failed bids
 : 19 M9A1 pistols evaluated as a replacement for the Browning L9A1 pistol, lost to the Glock 17 Gen 4

Gallery

See also
 Caracal pistol—also designed by Wilhelm Bubits

Citations

General bibliography

External links

 Steyr Mannlicher—official site
 Steyr L-A1 instruction manual
 Steyr M-A1 instruction manual
 Steyr C-A1 instruction manual
 Steyr S-A1 instruction manual
 Steyr A2 MF instruction manual
 Modern Firearms
 REMTEK—Arms
 The Sight M1911A1—Steyr M series history and review
 Steyr M9—brief article in Guns Magazine, Oct. 1999, by Massad Ayoob

.357 SIG semi-automatic pistols
.40 S&W semi-automatic pistols
9mm Parabellum semi-automatic pistols
Police weapons
Steyr semi-automatic pistols
Weapons and ammunition introduced in 1999